Perumuchi is a census town in Vellore district in the Indian state of Tamil Nadu.

Demographics
 India census, Perumuchi had a population of 8140. Males constitute 53% of the population and females 47%. Perumuchi has an average literacy rate of 78%, higher than the national average of 59.5%: male literacy is 83%, and female literacy is 72%. In Perumuchi, 15% of the population is under 6 years of age.

References

Cities and towns in Vellore district